The protected areas of Colombia are grouped into the National System of Protected Areas.

National Natural Park System 
The National Natural Park System is divided into the following categories:
 National Natural Parks (Parque Natural Nacional - PNN): 43
 Fauna and Flora Sanctuaries (Sanctuario de Flora y Fauna - SFF): 12
 National Natural Reserves (Reserva Natural Nacional - RNN): 2
 Unique Natural Areas (Área Natural Única - ANU): 1
 Road park (Vía Parque): 1

List of Nationally Protected Areas

Proposed areas 
Currently there are other proposed areas for national natural parks:
 Morichales de Paz de Ariporo

The following locations could be declared fauna and flora sanctuaries:
 Bosque Seco del Patía
 Serranía de Pinche
 Serranía de San Lucas

Disbanded areas 
Some zones of the park system had been disbanded because of negative human impact on the environment:
 SSF Arauca
 PNN Manaure

References 

 
Colombia
National parks